The Casa de Moneda de Colombia  (Spanish for Colombian mint) is a Colombian currency museum based in the city of Bogotá. It was founded in 1621 as the mint ("casa de moneda" translates as "mint"). The current mint is known simply as the Fábrica de Moneda (coin factory).

The Old Mint of Colombia is part of the Banrepcultural Network along with the Botero Museum, the Gold Museum, the Luis Ángel Arango Library, and the Miguel Urrutia Art Museum in Bogotá.

See also 

 Colombian Peso
 List of Mints

References

External links 
  Casa de Moneda
  COLOMBIAN BANKNOTES AND COINS

Numismática en Bogotá Colombia (Monedas y Billetes de Colombia)
Monetario - Colombia

Mints (currency)
1621 establishments in the Spanish Empire
Museums in Bogotá
Numismatic museums in South America
National Monuments of Colombia